Daniel Kingsley Povenmire (born September 18, 1963) is an American animator, voice actor, writer, director, and producer. With Jeff "Swampy" Marsh, Povenmire co-created the Disney animated series Phineas and Ferb and Milo Murphy's Law, in both of which he voiced the character Heinz Doofenshmirtz. In October 2020, Povenmire announced a new series for Disney Channel titled Hamster & Gretel, which premiered in 2022.

Povenmire grew up in Mobile, Alabama, where he was an art student, and where he spent summers outdoors and making movies. Povenmire attended the University of South Alabama before deciding to pursue a film career and transferring to the University of Southern California.

Povenmire has been a long-time contributor to the animation business, working on several different animated television series such as Hey Arnold!, The Simpsons, Rocko's Modern Life, and SpongeBob SquarePants. He was a longtime director on the prime time series Family Guy, where he was nominated for an Annie Award in 2005. He left the series to create Phineas and Ferb with Jeff "Swampy" Marsh. Povenmire has been nominated for several awards for his work on the show, including a BAFTA, an Annie, and two Emmy Awards. Following the success of Phineas and Ferb, he and Marsh created and produced a second show for Disney titled Milo Murphy's Law, which premiered in 2016. In 2020, the duo made a second Phineas and Ferb film, Candace Against the Universe.

Early life

Daniel Kingsley Povenmire was born in San Diego, California, on September 18, 1963, and grew up in the city of Mobile, Alabama. A child prodigy, he began drawing at age two; by the time he was ten, his work was displayed in local art shows. His first efforts in animation included a series of flip books that he produced in his school text books. As a child, Povenmire considered animator Chuck Jones his hero; in a 2009 interview, he stated that "every drawing he [Jones] did was beautiful to look at and had so much energy in it". Hayao Miyazaki was also an early influence.

Education

Povenmire received his secondary education at Shaw High School in Mobile. Initially, he attended the University of South Alabama, where he created his first popular comic strip, Life is a Fish, devoted to the life of Herman the goldfish and the college students he lives with. Povenmire also supported himself as a waiter and performer at a dinner theater. In 1985, he transferred to the University of Southern California (USC), planning to pursue a career in film.

Soon after arriving at USC, he pitched Life is a Fish to Mark Ordesky, the editor-in-chief of the Daily Trojan, the university newspaper. Ordesky first "basically brushed [him] off", but, after viewing Povenmire's portfolio, accepted the strip. Fish ran daily in the paper. Though the rapid pace left Povenmire afraid he was "running out of ideas", he never missed a deadline and made $14,000 a year through Fish merchandise, which included T-shirts, books, and calendars sold at the campus craft fair. The discipline of regular production also helped teach Povenmire to "represent something in the least amount of lines".

Career

Early works

Povenmire left USC without finishing the degree requirements, and used the money from Fish merchandise to fund a short-lived career as a street artist. His first professional animation commission came on the Tommy Chong project Far Out Man, for which Povenmire produced two minutes of animation. By age 24, Povenmire was freelancing on several animated television series, including Teenage Mutant Ninja Turtles. In 1989, he appeared in a small role as a band member in Adam Sandler's first film, Going Overboard.

The Simpsons
In the 1990s, Povenmire secured a job  as a character layout animator on the hit animated series The Simpsons. His desk placed him opposite Jeffrey Marsh, another up-and-coming animator. They shared similar tastes in humor and music, and later became colleagues on other projects.

Povenmire's experience, from both previous industry work and from his own projects, earned him respect at The Simpsons. He worked on layout animation and collaborated on storyboard production for the series, recalling later that staff were handed pages of production notes and instructed to "Do the [creative consultant] Brad Bird notes and any others that make sense." He maintained a side interest in film, writing scripts and the screenplay for a low-budget horror movie, Psycho Cop 2. The movie's producers offered Povenmire the opportunity to direct the film, but its terms required that he quit The Simpsons.  Povenmire chose to stay with The Simpsons, which he enjoyed and considered a better fit with his future ambitions. Rif Coogan ended up directing the picture instead.

Rocko's Modern Life

Work on The Simpsons involved an irregular schedule. The producers laid off the animation staff for two-to-three-month periods, and rehired the staff later in the production cycle. During one of these layoffs, Povenmire found a temporary job on the series Rocko's Modern Life, Nickelodeon's first in-house cartoon production. The show's creator, television newcomer Joe Murray, hired Povenmire solely on the strength of his Life is a Fish comic strips, which proved he could both write and draw.

Though Povenmire started on Rocko simply to occupy his downtime from The Simpsons, he found the greater creative freedom he enjoyed on his temporary job compelling, and quit The Simpsons to work on Rocko full-time. There, he reunited with Jeff Marsh, this time as a writing partner; Marsh claimed the crew hoped Povenmire's neatness would offset his own sloppy storyboarding. The pair developed a distinctive style characterized by characteristic musical numbers and chase scenes. Povenmire and Marsh won an Environmental Achievement Award for a 1996 Rocko episode they had written.

Family Guy and SpongeBob SquarePants
Povenmire later became a director on Family Guy, starting with the season two episode "Road to Rhode Island". Creator Seth MacFarlane granted Povenmire substantial creative freedom. Povenmire recalled that MacFarlane would tell him "We've got two minutes to fill. Give me some visual gags. Do whatever you want. I trust you." Povenmire praised MacFarlane's management style for letting him "have [...] fun."

Povenmire brought realism and material from his own experiences to the visual direction of Family Guy. For "One If by Clam, Two If by Sea" (August 1, 2001), several characters demonstrate Fosse-like moves in prison. To correctly depict the moves, Povenmire asked color artist Cynthia MacIntosh, who had been a professional dancer, to strike poses so he could properly illustrate the sequence. In the episode "To Love and Die in Dixie" (November 15, 2001), Povenmire drew on his childhood in the Deep South to create and sequence a background scene in which the redneck character nonchalantly kicks a corpse into the nearby river.

"Brian Wallows and Peter's Swallows" (January 17, 2002), a Family Guy episode which Povenmire directed, won the Emmy Award for Best Song. Creator MacFarlane, the recipient of the award, noted that Povenmire deserved to have received the award for the contribution the visuals made to the episode's win. Povenmire responded in jest, "That's a nice sentiment and all, but did he offer to give me his? No! And it's not like he doesn't already have two of his own just sitting in his house!" Povenmire was nominated for an Annie Award for Directing in an Animated Television Production for the episode "PTV" (November 6, 2005) but lost out to a fellow Family Guy director, Peter Shin, who had directed the episode "North by North Quahog". Povenmire and several others were also nominated for their work on "PTV" in the Outstanding Animated Program (for Programming Less Than One Hour) category at the Primetime Emmy Awards. Povenmire also received the same nomination for "Road to Rhode Island."

During Family Guys brief cancellation, Povenmire was offered a job as storyboard director of the series SpongeBob SquarePants. He also became a writer for the show, writing the season 2 episodes "Graveyard Shift", "The Fry Cook Games" and "Sandy, SpongeBob and the Worm", all of which premiered on Nickelodeon between 2001–2002. He also wrote "The Campfire Song Song" for the Season 3 episode "The Camping Episode", for which he was also a storyboard director on alongside Jay Lender (April 3, 2004).

Phineas and Ferb

In 1993, Povenmire and Marsh conceived the series Phineas and Ferb, based on their similar experiences of childhood summers spent outdoors.  Povenmire spent 14–16 years pitching Phineas and Ferb to several networks. Most rejected it as unfeasible for the complexity of its plots, but Povenmire persevered, later observing "It was really the show we wanted to see: if this was on the air, I'd watch it, and I don't always feel that about every show I work on." Even the Walt Disney Company initially rejected Povenmire's pitch, but asked to keep the proposal packet: "Usually that means they throw it in the trash later," Povenmire recalled.  Eventually Disney called Povenmire back with an acceptance, on the condition that he would produce an 11-minute pilot. He called Marsh, who was living in England, to ask him if he would like to work on the pilot; Marsh accepted immediately and moved back to the United States.

Instead of a conventional script, the pair pitched the pilot by recording reels of its storyboard, which Povenmire then mixed and dubbed to produce action and vocals. The network approved the show for a 26-episode season. As a result, Povenmire left Family Guy to create the series.

Povenmire and Marsh wanted to incorporate into Phineas and Ferb the kind of humor they had developed in their work on Rocko's Modern Life. They included action sequences and, with Disney's encouragement, featured musical numbers in every episode subsequent to "Flop Starz". Povenmire described the songs as his and Marsh's "jab at immortality", but the pair have earned two Emmy nominations for Phineas and Ferb songs to-date. A third Emmy nomination, for the episode "The Monster of Phineas-n-Ferbenstein" (2008), pitted the show against SpongeBob SquarePants, although neither nominee received the award due to a technicality. In 2010, Povenmire was nominated amongst several other Phineas and Ferb crew members for the Daytime Emmy Award for both "Outstanding Writing in Animation" and "Outstanding Original Song – Children’s and Animation" for their work on the show, winning for "Outstanding Writing in Animation". In 2021, Povenmire, among other writers, won an Emmy Award for "Outstanding Writing Team for a Daytime Animated Program" for their film Candace Against the Universe.

The distinctive style of the animation legend Tex Avery influenced the show's artistic look. Like Avery, Povenmire employed geometric shapes to build both the characters and the background. The style developed almost accidentally, with Povenmire's first sketch of title character, Phineas Flynn, which he produced while eating dinner with his family in a restaurant in South Pasadena, California. He doodled a triangle-shaped child on the butcher paper covering the table. He was so taken with the sketch he tore it out, kept it, and used it as the prototype for Phineas and as the stylistic blueprint for the entire show.

Musical endeavors
During his college years, Povenmire had performed with a band that played at clubs and bars across Los Angeles, California. His current band, Keep Left, releases albums through Arizona University Recordings. Their second CD, Letters from Fielding, became available for download on aurec.com during 2004. They have an official website maintained and updated by artist Larry Stone. A 2004 email exchange about the website between Stone and Povenmire resulted in a "clever and twisted" series of comic strips drawn by the two, eventually moved to the website Badmouth.

Filmography

Films

Animation

Web series

Notes

References

External links

 
 
 
 

1963 births
Living people
Writers from San Diego
American television directors
American television writers
American male television writers
Television producers from California
Showrunners
American storyboard artists
American male voice actors
Male actors from San Diego
Writers from Mobile, Alabama
University of Southern California alumni
University of South Alabama alumni
Disney Television Animation people
American animated film directors
Screenwriters from Alabama
Screenwriters from California
Animators from Alabama
Nickelodeon Animation Studio people
Television producers from Alabama
American TikTokers